Ha Sue-kyung (born 17 May 1969) is a former synchronized swimmer from South Korea.

References

External links 
 Video of Ha and her partner Kim Mi-Jin-Su practicing on 1 August 1988, via Munhwa Broadcasting Corporation 

1969 births
Living people
South Korean synchronized swimmers
Olympic synchronized swimmers of South Korea
Synchronized swimmers at the 1988 Summer Olympics